West Savu is a district of Sabu Raijua Regency, East Nusa Tenggara province of Indonesia. , located on Savu Island. It includes the town of Menia, the seat capital of Sabu Raijua Regency.

References

Populated places in East Nusa Tenggara
Regency seats of East Nusa Tenggara